Clivages is the ninth studio album by Belgian RIO band Univers Zero.  Only four of the ten tracks were composed by Daniel Denis, who composed a majority of the material on most previous releases .  The opening track, Les Kobolds, incorporates Flemish folk music for the first time in a Univers Zero piece.

Track listing

Personnel
Michel Berckmans: bassoon, English horn, oboe, melodica
Kurt Budé: clarinet, bass clarinet, alto saxophone
Pierre Chevalier: keyboards, glockenspiel
Daniel Denis: drums, percussion, sampler
Dimitri Evers: electric bass, fretless bass
Andy Kirk: guitar (tracks 2 and 5); percussion (track 2)
Martin Lauwers: violin

Also with:
Nicolas Denis: drums (track 10)
Philippe Thuriot: accordion (tracks 1 and 10)
Aurelia Boven: cello (track 10)

References

2010 albums
Univers Zero albums